The ¥10,000 note (1万円紙幣 ichiman-en shihei) is the largest banknote denomination of the Japanese yen, as well as the largest denomination of the Japanese yen overall.

It was first introduced in Japan in 1958 to the third series of banknote releases (Series C). The latest release is Series E (2004).

Series

Series C 
The note was introduced on 1 December 1958. The brown-green note includes Prince Shōtoku on the front and a pillar painting of Hōō (Fenghuang), in the Hall of the Phoenix, Byōdō-in, Kyoto on the back.

Series D 
The note was released on 12 of September 1984. The brown note has Fukuzawa Yukichi, a Meiji era philosopher and the founder of Keio University, on the front and a pair of pheasants on the back.

Series E 
The series was released on 1 November 2004. The front side of the note retains the portrait of Fukuzawa. The back of the note sees the return of a drawing of the Hōō in Byōdō-in.

Extensive anti-counterfeiting measures are present in the banknote. They include intaglio printing, holograms, microprinting, fluorescent ink, latent images, watermarks, and angle-sensitive ink.

Series F 
On 9 April 2019, Finance Minister Tarō Asō announced new designs for the ¥1,000, ¥5,000, and ¥10,000 notes, for use beginning in 2024. The ¥10,000 bill will feature Shibusawa Eiichi and Tokyo Station.

On 1 September 2021, however, it was announced via Twitter that the printing of the new note had commenced.

References

See also
10,000 yen coin
Banknotes of the Japanese yen

Japanese yen banknotes
Ten-thousand-base-unit banknotes
Prince Shōtoku